Poldervaart Edge is an east-facing escarpment rising to about 1,300 m and trending NE-SW for 3.5 nautical miles (6 km) in the Du Toit Nunataks, Read Mountains, Shackleton Range. Photographed from the air by the U.S. Navy, 1967, and surveyed by British Antarctic Survey (BAS), 1968–71. In association with the names of geologists grouped in this area, named by the United Kingdom Antarctic Place-Names Committee (UK-APC) in 1971 after Professor Arie Poldervaart (1919–64), Dutch petrologist known for his research on basaltic rocks.

References 

Escarpments of Antarctica
Landforms of Coats Land